Ashk Ali Tak (born 7 July 1956 is a Rajya Sabha member in Rajasthan.
He was elected in 2010. He is also member of Rajasthan Legislative Assembly from Mar. 1985- 15 Oct. 1985 and Dec. 1989 - March 1990. He was first Deputy Chief Whip in Rajasthan Legislative Assembly.

References
 

Rajya Sabha members from Rajasthan
1958 births
Living people
Rajasthan MLAs 1985–1990
Rajasthan MLAs 2008–2013
Rajasthan MLAs 2013–2018
Indian National Congress politicians from Rajasthan